Katharine Elinda Nash Purvis (May 19, 1842 – October 23, 1907) is best known as the lyricist for When the Saints Are Marching In.

Purvis was the daughter of a Methodist minister in Pennsylvania. After graduating from a seminary in 1860, she became a music teacher at the seminary of a Methodist Episcopal Church in Williamsport, Pennsylvania. In 1896, the hymn When the Saints Are Marching In was published, with music by James Milton Black. Later, the song was altered somewhat and published in 1927 as the well known When The Saints Go Marching In.

References

 Fuld, James J, The Book of World Famous Music: Classical, Popular and Folk, 1966.

External links
The Cyber Hymnal

1842 births
1907 deaths
American lyricists
People from Williamsport, Pennsylvania
19th-century American writers
19th-century American women writers
Writers from Pennsylvania
Songwriters from Pennsylvania